The San Jose de Trozo Parish Church is a Roman Catholic church in Santa Cruz, Manila founded in 1933. The current parish priest is Rev. Fr. Peterson O. Tieng, LRMS The church is under the jurisdiction of the Roman Catholic Archdiocese of Manila.

References 

Roman Catholic churches in Manila
Buildings and structures in Santa Cruz, Manila